Robert Bruce McPherson Sr (December 26, 1891 - May 13, 1947) served in the California State Assembly for the 10th district from January 3, 1921 - January 7, 1929. During World War I he also served in the United States Army.

References

External links
Join California Robert B. McPherson
Biography of Hon . Robert B. McPherson;Solano County, CA Biographies

United States Army personnel of World War I
1891 births
1947 deaths
Republican Party members of the California State Assembly
20th-century American politicians
University of California alumni